Burrell Township is a township in Decatur County, Iowa, USA.  As of the 2000 census, its population was 354.

Geography
Burrell Township covers an area of 35.8 square miles (92.72 square kilometers); of this, 0.12 square miles (0.3 square kilometers) or 0.32 percent is water. The streams of Elk Creek and Potteroff Creek run through this township.

History
Burrell Township was created in 1850. It is named for county commissioner Asa Burrell.

Cities and towns
 Davis City (northwest three-quarters)

Unincorporated towns
 Barrell
 Terre Haute
(This list is based on USGS data and may include former settlements.)

Adjacent townships
 Decatur Township (north)
 Center Township (northeast)
 Eden Township (east)
 Hamilton Township (southeast)
 New Buda Township (south)
 Fayette Township (southwest)
 Bloomington Township (west)
 Grand River Township (northwest)

Cemeteries
The township contains five cemeteries: Bucy, Davis City, Gore, Miller and Terre Haute.

Major highways
 Interstate 35
 U.S. Route 69

References
 U.S. Board on Geographic Names (GNIS)
 United States Census Bureau cartographic boundary files

External links
 US-Counties.com
 City-Data.com

Townships in Decatur County, Iowa
Townships in Iowa